This page details football records in Spain. Unless otherwise stated, records are taken from Primera División or La Liga. This page also includes records from the Spanish domestic cup competition or Copa del Rey.

League records

La Liga

Segunda División

All-time table
The all-time table is an overall record of all match results, points, and goals of every team that has played in La Segunda División since its inception in 1929. The table that follows is accurate as of the end of the 2020–21 season. The table also considers the 1929 Segunda División Grupo B as the second tier.

Notes

Segunda División B

All-time table (1977–2021)
The all-time table is an overall record of all match results, points, and goals of every team that has played in Segunda División B (third division) since its creation in 1977 and until its last season, 2020–21. The division was replaced by Segunda División RFEF and demoted to fourth tier, after the creation of a new third tier named Primera División RFEF.

Notes

Tercera División

All-time table (1929–2021)
The all-time table is an overall record of all match results, points, and goals of every team that has played in Tercera División (third division until 1977; fourth division until 2021) since its creation in 1929 and until its last season, 2020–21. The division was replaced by Tercera División RFEF and demoted to fifth tier, after the creation of a new third tier named Primera División RFEF.

Copa del Rey
Records in this section refers to Copa del Rey from its founding in 1902 through to the present.

 Most wins: 31, Barcelona (1910, 1912, 1913, 1920, 1922, 1925, 1926, 1928, 1942, 1951, 1952, 1953, 1957, 1959, 1963, 1968, 1971, 1978, 1981, 1983, 1988, 1990, 1997, 1998, 2009, 2012, 2015, 2016, 2017, 2018, 2021)
 Most consecutive wins: 4, joint record:
 Barcelona (2015, 2016, 2017, 2018)
 Athletic Bilbao (1930, 1931, 1932, 1933)
 Real Madrid (1905, 1906, 1907, 1908)
 Most consecutive finals played: 6, Barcelona (2014, 2015, 2016, 2017, 2018, 2019) 
 Most finals played: 42, Barcelona (1910, 1912, 1913, 1919, 1920, 1922, 1925, 1926, 1928, 1932, 1936, 1942, 1951, 1952, 1953, 1954, 1957, 1959, 1963, 1968, 1971, 1974, 1978, 1981, 1983, 1984, 1986, 1988, 1990, 1996, 1997, 1998, 2009, 2011, 2012, 2014, 2015, 2016, 2017, 2018, 2019, 2021)
 Most finals without winning: 4, Celta Vigo (1908, 1948, 1994, 2001)
 Most finals without losing: 2, Deportivo La Coruña (1995, 2002)
 Biggest win in a final: joint record
 Barcelona 5–0 Sevilla (2018)
 Athletic Bilbao 5–0 Espanyol (1915)
 Real Madrid 6–1 Castilla (1980)
 Most goals in a final: 8, Sevilla 6–2 Racing de Ferrol (1939)
 Most goals by a losing side: 3, joint record:
Athletic Bilbao losing 3–4 against Barcelona 1942
Valencia losing 3–4 against Barcelona 1971
 Most consecutive rounds won: 24, Barcelona (16 December 2014 – 27 February 2019)
 Biggest home win: Real Murcia 14–0 Cieza Promesas (first round, 10 September 1991–92 Copa del Rey)
 Biggest away win: Don Benito 0–13 Celta Vigo (first round, 10 April 1932 Copa del Rey). The game was played at Celta Vigo Balaídos stadium
 Biggest winning scoreline: Celta Vigo 22–0 Don Benito (first round 1932 Copa del Rey)
 Longest penalty shoot-out: 28 (14 rounds), joint record:
 Real Ávila 12–13 Real Burgos (29 September 1986–87 Copa del Rey)
 Córdoba 12–13 Deportivo La Coruña (11 September 2013–14 Copa del Rey)

Top 10 goalscorers, all-time

Players in bold are still active

Individual 
 Most wins: 7
Agustín Gaínza (Athletic Bilbao) (1943, 1944, 1945, 1950, 1955, 1956, 1958)
Lionel Messi (Barcelona) (2009, 2012, 2015, 2016, 2017, 2018, 2021)
Sergio Busquets (Barcelona) (2009, 2012, 2015, 2016, 2017, 2018, 2021)
Gerard Piqué (Barcelona) (2009, 2012, 2015, 2016, 2017, 2018, 2021)
 Most appearances: 104, Andoni Zubizarreta (Athletic Bilbao, Barcelona and Valencia)
 Most appearances at one club: 99, Agustín Gaínza (Athletic Bilbao)
 Most appearances in a final: 10
Lionel Messi (Barcelona) (2009, 2011, 2012, 2014, 2015, 2016, 2017, 2018, 2019, 2021)
Sergio Busquets (Barcelona) (2009, 2011, 2012, 2014, 2015, 2016, 2017, 2018, 2019, 2021)
 Most goals scored: 81, Telmo Zarra (Athletic Bilbao)
 Most goals scored in one game: 8, Agustín Gaínza (Athletic Bilbao) 12–1 against Celta Vigo 18 May 1947
 Most goals scored in one season: 21, Josep Samitier (Barcelona) 1928
 Most goals scored in a final: 4, Telmo Zarra (Athletic Bilbao) 1950
 Most goals scored in finals: 9, Lionel Messi (Barcelona)
 Most finals scored in: 7, Lionel Messi (2009, 2012, 2015, 2017, 2018, 2019, 2021)
 Most consecutive finals scored in: 4, Telmo Zarra (Athletic Bilbao) (1942, 1943, 1944, 1945)
 Most assists provided in finals: 6, Lionel Messi (1 in 2009, 2 in 2016, 1 in 2017, 2 in 2018)

Most successful clubs overall

See also
 Copa del Rey
 La Liga
 La Liga records and statistics
 List of Copa del Rey finals
 List of Spanish football champions
 Supercopa de España

References

Further reading 
 Martínez Calatrava, Vicente (2002). Historia y estadística del fúbol español. De la Olimpiada de Amberes a la Guerra Civil (1920–1939). 
 Martínez Calatrava, Vicente (2002). Historia y estadística del fútbol español. De la Guerra Civil al Mundial de Brasil (1939–1950). 
 Martínez Calatrava, Vicente (2002). Historia y estadística del fútbol español. Del gol de Zarra al gol de Marcelino (1950–1964). 
 Martínez Calatrava, Vicente (2002). Historia y estadística del fútbol español. Del Campeonato de Europa al Mundial de España (1964–1982). 
 Martínez Calatrava, Vicente (2002). Historia y estadística del fútbol español. Del Mundial 82 a la final española de París (1982–2001).

External links
Liga de Fútbol Profesional - Historical football data provided by the official Spanish league webpage
hesgoal website 
hesgoal website 
hesgoal website 

Football records and statistics in Spain
La Liga records and statistics
Spanish football club statistics
Spain
Spanish records